Taman Melati LRT station is an elevated rapid transit station in northern Kuala Lumpur, Malaysia, part of the Kelana Jaya Line (formerly known as PUTRA). The station was opened on 1 June 1999, as part of the line's second segment encompassing 12 stations between Masjid Jamek station and Terminal PUTRA (not including Sri Rampai station) and an underground line.

Location
Taman Melati station is on the northern edge of Kuala Lumpur's city limits, 400 metres from the nearest Kuala Lumpur-Selayang border, and was built along Persiaran Pertahanan. In addition to serving its namesake location, Taman Melati, to the east, the station is also accessible from other surrounding housing estates, including Gombak Setia to the west (in east Gombak), Taman Setapak Jaya to the south (north of Setapak), and, to an extent, Taman Cemerlang to the north.

Taman Melati station is the last station northwards to Gombak, and is one of two Kelana Jaya Line stations serving the Taman Melati and Taman Cemerlang areas, the other being Gombak itself.

Design
As an elevated station, Taman Melati station contains three levels: The access points at street level, and the ticket area and adjoining platforms on the two elevated levels. All levels are linked via stairways, escalators and elevators designated for disabled passengers. The station uses a single island platform for trains travelling in both directions of the line, and is entirely sheltered by a gabled roof supported by latticed frames.

Feeder buses

External links

KL MRT Website

Kelana Jaya Line
Railway stations opened in 1999
1999 establishments in Malaysia
20th-century architecture in Malaysia